It's a Boy is a 1933 British comedy film directed by Tim Whelan and starring Leslie Henson, Albert Burdon and Edward Everett Horton. It is a farce about a blackmailer who attempts to demand money from a young woman on the brink of marriage. It was based on the 1931 play It's a Boy by Austin Melford, an English adaption of the 1926 play Hurra, ein Junge by Franz Arnold and Ernst Bach. with sets designed by the art director Alex Vetchinsky.

Plot
On the eve of his society wedding, Dudley Leake and his best man James Skippett get drunk at his bachelor party. While in his cups Dudley confides to his friend about a brief fling he had with a woman just before the outbreak of the First World War in August 1914. The following morning they oversleep and are late for their wedding. While they are dressing themselves Joe Piper, a young man with a strong Northern accent, appears at the flat and claims to be Dudley's illegitimate son from his pre-war tryst.

The two men reject his claim, and leave him in the care of Allister the butler and hurry off to the wedding only to discover they have arrived too late. The ceremony has been postponed as the bride's family have gone. They hurry round to the Bogle household to try and justify their behaviour to Mary Bogle and her stern father. Rather than explain about being drunk, they claim they were called to an urgent business meeting and spend the rest of the day trying to produce a famous author "John Tempest" who they claim will provide them with an alibi about their late arrival.

Allister the butler, meanwhile, has been unable to prevent Joe Piper discovering about the wedding and he also heads to the Bogle household and begins demanding large sums of money from Dudley in exchange for keeping quiet about their relationship. Skippett then persuades Joe Piper to pretend to be Tempest unaware that in real life she is actually a woman, and one of the bride's guests at the wedding. They slowly dig themselves deeper and deeper into a hole, and the Bogles prepare to leave for a holiday in Southern France.

Eventually, after both Piper and Skippett have dressed up as women and pretended to be Tempest, the Bogles agree that Dudley can marry her daughter only for Piper to reveal to them that he was Dudley's "love child" when he is not paid the blackmail money he demands. The wedding is saved, however, when a police inspector arrives and reveals that Piper's real father is not Dudley but rather Mr Bogle who had also had a fling with his mother in 1914.

Cast
Leslie Henson as James Skippett
Albert Burdon as Joe Piper
Edward Everett Horton as Dudley Leake
Heather Thatcher as Anita Gunn
Alfred Drayton as Eustace Bogle
Robertson Hare as Allister
Wendy Barrie as Mary Bogle
Helen Haye as Mrs. Bogle
Joyce Kirby as Lillian, the Maid
Finlay Currie as Publisher
J.H. Roberts as Registrar

See also
Hooray, It's a Boy! (1931)
Hooray, It's a Boy! (1953)
 (1961)

References

External links

British comedy films
1933 comedy films
Films directed by Tim Whelan
Films produced by Michael Balcon
British films based on plays
British remakes of German films
Gainsborough Pictures films
Films set in London
Islington Studios films
British black-and-white films
Films with screenplays by John Paddy Carstairs
1930s British films